The British Psychotherapy Foundation, Bpf, is the successor organisation to three former long-established British psychotherapy providers and clinical training institutions which merged in April 2013. The original constituents are the British Association of Psychotherapists, BAP (1951), The Lincoln Clinic and Centre for Psychotherapy (1968) and the London Centre for Psychotherapy, LCP, (1976). It is unique in the United Kingdom for providing treatment services for children and adults in all the psychoanalytic modalities, that is of Freudian and Jungian inspiration. It is also unique in providing professional training in those modalities within one institution and is regulated by the British Psychoanalytic Council. It has charitable status. Its current associations are:

 British Jungian Analytic Association (BJAA), a member society of the International Association for Analytical Psychology 
 Independent Psychoanalytic Child and Adolescent Psychotherapy Association (IPCAPA)
 Psychoanalytic Psychotherapy Association (PPA)

History
Until it de-merged in 2019, the recently formed, British Psychoanalytic Association has been a fourth constituent of Bpf, (it was integral to the BAP).

Bpf runs MSc and Phd programmes in Psychodynamics of Human Development with Birkbeck, University of London in Jungian and Psychoanalytic modalities.
Bpf and the University of Exeter offer a two-year Clinical Psychoanalytic Psychotherapy or Psychodynamic Psychotherapy training in Devon.  
The Bpf is the owner, (acquired by BAP in 2006) and publisher with John Wiley & Son of the foremost British academic journal in the field since 1984, The British Journal of Psychotherapy.

Notable members 
 Rosemary Gordon
 Carol Topolski  
 Clare Winnicott

See also
 British Psychoanalytic Council
 British Psychoanalytical Society
 Mental health in the United Kingdom
 Psychoanalytic infant observation
 Society of Analytical Psychology

References

External links
 Bpf website
 IPCAPA/UCL Doctorate in Child and Adolescent Psychotherapy
 Bpf/University of Exeter Clinical Psychotherapy training
 website of the British Journal of Psychotherapy
 Birkbeck MSc in the Psychodynamics of Human Development

Learned societies of the United Kingdom
Organizations established in 2013
Psychotherapy in the United Kingdom
1951 establishments in the United Kingdom
Health in London
Mental health organisations in the United Kingdom
Psychology institutes
Child development organizations